Albert Mitchell was a soccer player.

Albert Mitchell may also refer to:

The Answer Man, 1940s radio presenter Albert Mitchell
Bert Mitchell, English footballer 
Roy Mitchell (baseball), Albert Roy Mitchell, baseball player
Al Mitchell, Albert Edwin Mitchell

See also
Bert Mitchell (disambiguation)